The post of the Assam Rifles near Oinam village, Manipur, was attacked and looted by the National Socialist Council of Nagaland (NSCN) on July 9, 1987. The Act resulted in killing 9 jawans of the post and looting of large amount of machinery and ammunition. In response to this act, and to retain the looted firearms Operation Bluebird was launched by the Army officials. The search operation continued for more than 3 months till October, 1987, in more than 30 villages but no arms and ammunitions were recovered.

History
However, the villagers were brutally tortured, human-rights were violated on a large scale during this period and even pregnant women were forced to give birth to their babies in the presence of the jawans. Innocent villagers were tortured by the high-ranked military officials and even some of them were buried alive after third degree torture. More than 300 people claimed to be tortured, 3 women claimed to be raped and 5 claimed of being molested. The villagers were also forced to prepare food for the soldiers for than 2 months until the villagers ended their granary stocks.

After months of suffering the villagers requested the regional government for help, to which the CM of Manipur wrote to the Home Minister and even met Prime Minister Rajiv Gandhi regarding the torture and killing of the villagers by the soldiers of Assam Rifles. But this step enraged the military officers and they even tried to trap the Chief Minister, and other MP and MLA's in false cases of being involved in Anti-Nationalist Activities. 

Later, petition against the army officials was filed by the villagers in the Gauhati High Court. For more than 28 years, no action was taken on this case and later, due to the absence of any other records except the pleadings of the villagers it was discarded.

References 

1987 in India
Conflicts in 1987
Insurgency in Northeast India
1980s in Manipur